The Shropshire Warriors is a basketball team from Shropshire. It competed in the premier basketball league and is now in the English Basketball League in division 4.

History
The club was established in 1998 by members of the Committee of the Shropshire Schools Basketball Association (SSBBA) and the Shropshire Basketball Association to provide opportunities for players in full time education in Shropshire to play regular competitive basketball at higher than Inter-School level.

Basketball teams in England
Sport in Shropshire